Beihua University is a state-owned public university in Jilin City, Jilin, China.

Beihua University (BEIHUA) is a provincial comprehensive university with the most extensive scope in Jilin Province. Developing from 1906 and through the merger of three colleges in 1999, now BEIHUA has become a university with three campuses, which together occupy an area of 1,263,700 square meters with a floor space up to 830,300 square meters.

References

External links 
 Beihua University official website
 Beihua University official website 

Universities and colleges in Jilin